Huai Hia is a subdistrict in the Nakhon Thai District of Phitsanulok Province, Thailand.

Geography
Huai Hia is on a plateau in the Nan Basin, which is part of the Chao Phraya Watershed.

Administration
The subdistrict's mubans, (villages):

Economy
The economy of Huai Hia is based on agriculture.

Attractions
Huai Hia's main attraction is its waterfalls:
น้ำตกแก่งลาด
น้ำตกแม่เด๊ะ
น้ำตกแก่งทราย
น้ำตกแก่งสะพุง
น้ำตกแก่งกวางเน่า
น้ำตกตาไก้
น้ำตกตาดหมอก

References

Tambon of Phitsanulok province
Populated places in Phitsanulok province